Elopura is a state constituency in Sabah, Malaysia, that is represented in the Sabah State Legislative Assembly. It is situated within the Sandakan Parliamentary constituency

History

Election Results

References 

Sabah state constituencies